T. nigra may refer to:
 Tandonia nigra, an air-breathing land slug species
 Tarucus nigra, a small butterfly species found in India
 Tetraponera nigra, an ant species
 Trithemis nigra, a dragonfly species

See also
 Nigra (disambiguation)